William Doan (April 4, 1792 – June 22, 1847) was a U.S. Representative from Ohio for two terms from 1839 to 1843.

Biography 
Born in the District of Maine (then a part of the state of Massachusetts), Doan attended the common schools.
He moved with his parents in 1812 to Ohio and settled near Lindale, Clermont County.
He studied medicine at New Richmond and commenced practice in 1818 at Withamsville, Clermont County.
He graduated from the Ohio Medical College at Cincinnati in 1827.
He served as member of the State house of representatives in 1831 and 1832.
He served in the State senate in 1833 and 1834.

Congress
Doan was elected as a Democrat to the Twenty-sixth and Twenty-seventh Congresses (March 4, 1839 – March 3, 1843).
He was not a candidate for renomination in 1842.
He resumed the practice of medicine.

Death
He died in Withamsville, Ohio, June 22, 1847.
He was interred in Union Township (Mount Moriah) Cemetery, Tobasco, Ohio.

Sources

1792 births
1847 deaths
People from Clermont County, Ohio
University of Cincinnati College of Medicine alumni
Physicians from Ohio
Democratic Party Ohio state senators
Democratic Party members of the Ohio House of Representatives
Democratic Party members of the United States House of Representatives from Ohio
19th-century American politicians
Burials in Ohio